Carmela Corren ( Bizman, ;  – ) was an Israeli singer and actress.

Career

Corren was born Bizman in Tel Aviv, Mandatory Palestine, on 13 February 1938. She dreamed of being a dancer, but switched to singing in the wake of an injury. American television producer Ed Sullivan discovered her in 1956 during a work venture in Jerusalem. Corren, just out of military service, was persuaded to come to New York to appear on his show. She later toured South Africa with Cliff Richard and sang in English clubs.

Later, she starred in several films and television productions. With the beginning of the 1960s, Corren became well-known in Germany, as well as in Switzerland and Austria. She first signed to the Ariola label, then changed in 1966 to Vogue, and again in 1968 to Decca. In 1963, she represented Austria in the Eurovision Song Contest with her song Vielleicht geschieht ein Wunder, where she finished seventh.

Family
From 1966 to 1970, Corren was married to music producer Horst Geiger, with whom she had a daughter and a son. After retiring, she moved to the United States, where she settled down in Florida. She died on 15 January 2022, at the age of 83, in Hollywood, Florida.

Selected discography 
 Sei nicht traurig, geliebte Mama (You're Not Losing A Daughter, Mama) (1961)
 Eine Rose aus Santa Monica (1962)
 Wann kommt der Tag (1962)
 Vielleicht geschieht ein Wunder (1963) (Maybe A Miracle Will Happen)
 Wer in deine Augen sieht (1963)
 Rosen haben Dornen (1963)
 Einmal reicht uns das Glück seine Hände (1963)
 Abschiednehmen tut so weh (1965)
 Verzeih mir (1966)
 Die Liebe fängt mit Träumen an (1966)
 Alles war ein Traum (Même si tu revenais) (1967)
 Heiß wie die Sonne  (Hot like the sun) (1968)
 Tipot Hageshem טיפות הגשם (Raindrops; Hebrew covers of Burt Bacharach)
 Never, never, never (1979)

 Selected filmography 
 Drei Liebesbriefe aus Tirol (1962)
 Between Shanghai and St. Pauli (1962)
 His Best Friend (1962 film) (1962)
 Don't Fool with Me (1963)
 Hochzeit am Neusiedler See'' (1963)

References

External links 
 Homepage of Carmela Corren (German)
 Austrian Song Contest Fanclub (German)
 Deutsche Schlagerfestspiele (German)
 IMDB profile (English)
 

1938 births
2022 deaths
20th-century Israeli women singers
Israeli emigrants to the United States
Eurovision Song Contest entrants for Austria
Eurovision Song Contest entrants of 1963
Musicians from Tel Aviv
Israeli Jews